The Trunk Mystery is a 1926 American silent mystery film directed by Frank Hall Crane and starring Charles Hutchison, Alice Calhoun and Otto Lederer. It premiered in Britain in late 1926 before being released in America the following year.

Synopsis
A former secret agent acquired a trunk at a police auction, and the same night his house is robbed. It becomes apparent that some criminals stashed their loot in the trunk a few years before.

Cast
 Charles Hutchison as Jim Manning
 Alice Calhoun as Marion Hampton
 Richard Neill as Joe Fawcett
 Ben Walker as Turner
 Ford Sterling as Jeff
 Otto Lederer as Stevanov
 Charles W. Mack as John Hampton

References

Bibliography
 Wlaschin, Ken. Silent Mystery and Detective Movies: A Comprehensive Filmography. McFarland, 2009.

External links
 
 
 
 

1926 films
1926 mystery films
American silent feature films
American mystery films
American black-and-white films
Pathé Exchange films
Films directed by Frank Hall Crane
1920s English-language films
1920s American films
Silent mystery films